Robert Lincoln Drew (February 15, 1924 – July 30, 2014) was an American documentary filmmaker known as one of the pioneers—and sometimes called father—of cinéma vérité, or direct cinema, in the United States.  Two of his films, Primary and Crisis: Behind a Presidential Commitment, have been named to the National Film Registry of the Library of Congress. The moving image collection of Robert Drew is housed at the Academy Film Archive. The Academy Film Archive has preserved a number of his films, including Faces of November, Herself: Indira Gandhi, and Bravo!/Kathy's Dance. His many awards include an International Documentary Association Career Achievement Award.

Biography
Robert Drew was born in Toledo, Ohio. His father, Robert Woodsen Drew, was a film salesman and a pilot who ran a seaplane business. Drew grew up mostly in Fort Thomas, Kentucky. He left high school to join the U.S. Army Air Corps as a cadet in 1942 and qualified for officer's training. At the age of 19, he was a combat pilot in Italy flying the P-51 dive bomber, completing 30 successful combat missions.  During that time he met Ernie Pyle, an important experience for a pilot who would become a journalist. Drew was shot down behind the lines, where he survived for more than three months. Back in the U.S., he was a pilot in the First Fighter Group, the first to fly jet airplanes. He wrote an article for Life magazine about the experience flying a P-80 and was subsequently offered a job.

While working at Life as a writer and editor, Drew held a Nieman Fellowship at Harvard University. In 1955 he focused on two questions: Why are documentaries so dull? What would it take for them to become gripping and exciting?

He developed a unit within Time Inc. to realize his vision of developing documentary films that would use picture logic rather than word logic. Drew envisioned—as he explained in a 1962 interview—a form of documentary that would "drop word logic and find a dramatic logic in which things really happened". It would be "a theater without actors; it would be plays without playwrights; it would be reporting without summary and opinion; it would be the ability to look in on people’s lives at crucial times from which you could deduce certain things and see a kind of truth that can only be gotten from personal experience."

He formed Drew Associates around this time. Some of his early experiments premiered on The Ed Sullivan Show and The Jack Paar Show. Drew recruited like-minded filmmakers including Richard Leacock, D.A. Pennebaker, Terence Macartney-Filgate, and Albert Maysles, who all have had internationally renowned careers. They experimented with technology, syncing camera and sound with the parts of a watch. For Primary, Drew had Mitch Bogdanovich make smaller 16mm cameras that allowed for handheld use 

One of Drew Associates' best known films is Primary (1960), a documentary about the Wisconsin Primary election between Hubert Humphrey and John F. Kennedy. It is considered to be one of the first direct cinema documentaries. According to critic Matt Zoller Seitz, Primary "had as immense and measurable an impact on nonfiction filmmaking as Birth of a Nation had on fiction filmmaking."

After Kennedy responded positively to Primary, Drew "proposed to make a next film on him as a President having to deal with a crisis. 'Yes,' he said, 'What if I could look back and see what went on in the White House in the 24 hours before Roosevelt declared war on Japan?'" They finally got their chance when Governor George Wallace of Alabama pledged to personally stand in the doorway to block the enrollment of two African-American students in the University of Alabama to show his opposition to integration. Drew secured permission for Drew Associates filmmakers to shoot in the White House, particularly with Robert Kennedy, as well as in Alabama in the home of George Wallace, in the days leading up to June 11, 1963, when Wallace made his infamous stand. The resulting film, Crisis: Behind a Presidential Commitment, aired on TV in October 1963 and fueled discussions about the Civil Rights Movement as well as cinéma vérité, or direct cinema. It also triggered a storm of criticism over the admission of cameras into the White House. Afterward, politicians became more cautious about allowing access to documentary filmmakers, working closely with many of the original Drew Associates filmmakers who had and have continued to have documentary careers of their own.

Drew's films have been shown on ABC, PBS, the BBC, and film festivals all over the world. Film director Sir Ridley Scott credits his early experience working at Drew Associates as an assistant with turning his career from design to film.

Drew has made scores of documentaries and has won awards internationally. His subjects have included civil rights, other social issues, politics, music, dance and more. One of his most recent was From Two Men and a War, which recounts his experience as a World War II fighter pilot and his encounters with the Pulitzer Prize-winning reporter Ernie Pyle.

Death
Drew died on July 30, 2014, at his home in Sharon, Connecticut.

Select filmography

References

Further reading 
 P. J. O'Connell, "Robert Drew and the Development of Cinema Verite in America," Southern University Press, 1992
 Margaret A. Blanchard, "History of the Mass Media in the United States," Routledge, 1999
 Robert Drew, "A Nieman Year Spent Pondering Storytelling," Nieman Reports, Fall 2001
 "JFK Before the Camera," Richard Brody, The New Yorker, November 22, 2013
 "Reminiscences of Robert Drew: Oral History, 1980," Transcript and Tape, Columbia University Center for Oral History
 "New Challenges for Documentary," edited by Alan Rosenthal, University of California Press, 1988 (contains chapter by Robert Drew)
 Dave Saunders, Direct Cinema: Observational Documentary and the Politics of the Sixties, London, Wallflower Press 2007
 Richard Leacock, "The Feeling of Being There: a filmmaker's memoir," Semeion Editions, 2011

External links 
Drew Associates Web page
The Camera That Changed The World – a 59 minutes film by Mandy Chang
 Excerpt on Robert Drew from Peter Witonick Documentary "Cinema Verite: Defining the Moment" (1999)
"He Looked at J.F.K. Without the Myths: Robert Drew's documentaries following Kennedy from the campaign to presidency to his funeral played a key role in pioneering a synthesis of journalism and film," Los Angeles Times, 1993
Entry about Drew in The Museum of Broadcast Communications
Search for Robert Drew here for an informative 2003 New York Press article

Interview with Robert Drew at IFC.com
"JFK Before the Camera," Richard Brody, The New Yorker, November 22, 2013
"Reminiscences of Robert Drew: Oral History, 1980," Columbia University Center for Oral History
"Drew Masterworks, DVD intro film"

1924 births
2014 deaths
American documentary filmmakers
American Experience
Cinema pioneers
Artists from Toledo, Ohio
Peabody Award winners
Film directors from Ohio
Articles containing video clips